The Golden Circle is a tourist route in southern Iceland, covering about  looping from Reykjavík into the southern uplands of Iceland and back. It is the area that contains most tours and travel-related activities in Iceland.

The three primary stops on the route are the Þingvellir National Park, the Gullfoss waterfall, and the geothermal area in Haukadalur, which contains the geysers Geysir and Strokkur. Though Geysir has been mostly dormant for many years, Strokkur continues to erupt every 5–10 minutes. Other stops include the Kerið volcanic crater, the town of Hveragerði, Skálholt cathedral, and the Nesjavellir and Hellisheiðarvirkjun geothermal power plants.

The name Golden Circle is a marketing term for the route, derived from the name of Gullfoss, which means "golden waterfall" in Icelandic.

See also
 Diamond Circle

References

Tourism in Iceland